Serena Williams won the singles tennis title at the 2001 WTA Tour Championships by default, after Lindsay Davenport withdrew from the final. It was her first Tour Finals title.

Martina Hingis was the defending champion, but withdrew due to ankle surgery.

This was the last professional tournament for former world No. 4 Anke Huber.

Seeds

Notes
  Venus Williams ranked 3 had qualified but pulled out due to left wrist injury.
  Martina Hingis ranked 4 had qualified but pulled out due to ankle surgery.
  Monica Seles ranked 9 had qualified but chose not to play, given the fact that the tournament took place in Germany, the same country as her stabbing.

Draw

Finals

See also
WTA Tour Championships appearances

References

Singles 2001
2001 WTA Tour